The Paducah, KY-IL Micropolitan Statistical Area, as defined by the United States Census Bureau, is an area consisting of five counties – three in the Jackson Purchase region of Kentucky, a fourth Kentucky county bordering the Purchase, and one in southern Illinois – anchored by the city of Paducah, Kentucky.

As of the 2000 census, the μSA had a population of 98,765 (though a July 1, 2009 estimate placed the population at 98,609).

Counties
Ballard County, Kentucky
Graves County, Kentucky
Livingston County, Kentucky
McCracken County, Kentucky
Massac County, Illinois

Communities

Places with 10,000 to 50,000 inhabitants
Paducah, Kentucky (Principal City)
Mayfield, Kentucky

Places with 1,000 to 10,000 inhabitants
Calvert City, Kentucky (unconfirmed, supposed.)
Farley, Kentucky (census-designated place)
Hendron, Kentucky (census-designated place)
La Center, Kentucky
Ledbetter, Kentucky (census-designated place)
Massac, Kentucky (census-designated place)
Metropolis, Illinois
Reidland, Kentucky (census-designated place)

Places with 500 to 1,000 inhabitants
Brookport, Illinois
Barlow, Kentucky
Kevil, Kentucky
Salem, Kentucky
Wickliffe, Kentucky

Places with less than 500 inhabitants
Blandville, Kentucky
Carrsville, Kentucky
Grand Rivers, Kentucky
Joppa, Illinois
Lone Oak, Kentucky (census-designated place)
Smithland, Kentucky

Unincorporated places
Bandana, Kentucky
Bargerville, Illinois
Lovelaceville, Kentucky
Monkey's Eyebrow, Kentucky
New Liberty, Illinois
Round Knob, Illinois
Shady Grove, Illinois
Unionville, Illinois

Demographics
As of the census of 2000, there were 98,765 people, 41,398 households, and 28,070 families residing within the μSA. The racial makeup of the μSA was 78.31% White, 19.53% African American, 0.22% Native American, 0.40% Asian, 0.04% Pacific Islander, 0.35% from other races, and 1.14% from two or more races. Hispanics or Latinos of any race were 0.95% of the population.

The median income for a household in the μSA was $32,317, and the median income for a family was $40,613. Males had a median income of $33,797 versus $20,906 for females. The per capita income for the μSA was $17,994.

Combined Statistical Area
The Paducah–Mayfield Combined Statistical Area is made up of three counties in the Jackson Purchase region of Kentucky, a fourth Kentucky county that borders the Purchase, and one county in southern Illinois. The statistical area includes two micropolitan areas. As of the 2000 Census, the CSA had a population of 135,793 (though a July 1, 2009 estimate placed the population at 136,328).

Micropolitan Statistical Areas (μSAs)
Paducah (Ballard County, Kentucky; Livingston County, Kentucky; McCracken County, Kentucky; and Massac County, Illinois)
Mayfield (Graves County, Kentucky)

See also
Kentucky statistical areas
Illinois statistical areas

References

 
Micropolitan areas of Kentucky
Micropolitan areas of Illinois